Persicaria hydropiper (syn. Polygonum hydropiper), also known as water pepper, marshpepper knotweed, arse smart or tade, is a plant of the family Polygonaceae. A widespread species, Persicaria hydropiper is found in Australia, New Zealand, temperate Asia, Europe and North America. The plant grows in damp places and shallow water. Cultivated varieties are eaten in East Asia for their pungent flavor.

Description

The leaves are alternate and almost stalkless. The leaf blades are narrowly ovate and have entire margins  fringed by very short hairs. They are tapering with a blunt apex. Each leaf base has stipules which are fused into a stem-enclosing sheath that is loose and fringed at the upper end. The inflorescence is a nodding spike. The perianth of each tiny flower consists of four or five segments, united near its green base and white or pink at the edges. There are six stamens, three fused carpels and three styles. The fruit is a dark brown oval, flattened nut.

P. hydropiper is an annual, and prefers damp environments for optimal growth; it will readily grow in riparian zones on the banks of streams and rivers, but can also grow in other areas where water collects, such as on the banks of canals, tyre and hoof tracks in woodlands, waterlogged soil, and around gates in fields. P. hydropiper is also tolerant of partial shade and base-poor soil. In the United Kingdom, where the plant is native, it can grow at any altitude between sea level and 505 metres.

Biochemistry
Water pepper has several active ingredients. Two bicyclic sesquiterpenoids are present, polygodial (tadeonal, an unsaturated dialdehyde with a drimane backbone), and warburganal, which gives it its pungent taste. The plant also contains rutin, a source of the bitter taste impression.

Water pepper contains an essential oil (0.5%) which consists of monoterpenoids and sesquiterpenoids: α-pinene, β-pinene, 1,4-cineol, fenchone, α-humulene, β-caryophyllene, trans-β-bergamotene. Carboxylic acids (cinnamic, valeric and caproic acid) and their esters were present in traces. The composition depends strongly on genetic factors.

Wild water pepper produces oils that cause skin irritation.

Uses 
Water pepper is eaten in Japan, where it is known as tade (蓼), or more specifically, yanagi tade (柳蓼). The leaves are used as a vegetable, but only from the cultivar, not the wild type which has a far more pungent taste. The herb is usually sold in markets as seedlings. Young red sprouts are known as beni-tade (紅蓼), and are used to garnish sashimi, tempura, and sushi. It is popular for summer cooking. The seeds may also be added to wasabi. 

Water pepper sauce, known as tade-zu (蓼酢), is a sauce traditionally made from finely chopped water pepper leaves, soaked in vinegar, and a small amount of steamed rice. Occasionally, the juice from a squeezed kabosu is added. In Japanese cuisine it is traditionally used as a complement to grilled freshwater fish, but not saltwater fish.

In China, water pepper is known as la liao (辣蓼), and used in traditional Chinese medicine.

In Europe, water pepper was once cultivated and eaten during war time as a substitute for pepper.

The plant contains many acids, including formic acid, which makes it unpalatable to livestock. Though mammals do not eat wild water pepper, some insects do, giving rise to the Japanese saying "Tade kuu mushi mo sukizuki" (蓼食う虫も好き好き "Some insects eat water pepper and like it"), which may be translated as “There is no accounting for taste” or “Some prefer nettles.”

Gallery

References

External links
 Jepson Manual Treatment, University of California
 Australian Plant Name Index (APNI)

hydropiper
Spices
Flora of Europe
Flora of Australia
Flora of Asia
Flora of North America
Plants described in 1753
Taxa named by Carl Linnaeus